The Pierce County Courthouse is a historic governmental building in Ellsworth, Wisconsin, United States.  Built in 1905, the courthouse sits on the edge of Ellsworth's business district.  Built on a raised foundation of sandstone, it features elements of both the Beaux-Arts and the Neoclassical styles of architecture.  Among the distinctive elements of its construction are a large hexagonal dome and multiple Ionic columns.

In 1982, the Pierce County Courthouse was listed on the National Register of Historic Places, qualifying because of its historically significant architecture.

References

Government buildings completed in 1905
Beaux-Arts architecture in Wisconsin
Buildings and structures in Pierce County, Wisconsin
County courthouses in Wisconsin
Neoclassical architecture in Wisconsin
Courthouses on the National Register of Historic Places in Wisconsin
National Register of Historic Places in Pierce County, Wisconsin
1905 establishments in Wisconsin